Max Liebke (12 February 1892 – 1947) was a German entomologist, who researched about ground beetles. He wrote in a journal called Entomologischer Anzeiger, describing beetles that he discovered.

References 

German entomologists
1892 births
1947 deaths